Simopelta is a Neotropical genus of ants  in the subfamily Ponerinae.

Distribution
The genus is known from central and northern South America, where they are primarily found in mid-elevation moist forests.

Description
Workers are slender, small in size (2.1–4.9 mm), and black to orange in color. Queens are dichthadiiform (wingless and with enlarged gasters) and "morphologically simplified" relative to workers. Males remain unknown.

Species have an army-ant life style, including group predation and nomadism. However, belonging to the tribe Ponerini, they are evidently ponerines and the army-ant like characters are deemed to have evolved through convergent evolution. Compared to other ponerines, colonies are large, consisting of 1,000 to 2,000 individuals.

Species

Simopelta andersoni MacKay & MacKay, 2008
Simopelta bicolor Borgmeier, 1950
Simopelta breviscapa MacKay & MacKay, 2008
Simopelta curvata (Mayr, 1887)
Simopelta fernandezi MacKay & MacKay, 2008
Simopelta jeckylli (Mann, 1916)
Simopelta laevigata MacKay & MacKay, 2008
Simopelta laticeps Gotwald & Brown, 1967
Simopelta longinoda MacKay & MacKay, 2008
Simopelta longirostris MacKay & MacKay, 2008
Simopelta manni Wheeler, 1935
Simopelta mayri MacKay & MacKay, 2008
Simopelta minima (Brandao, 1989)
Simopelta oculata Gotwald & Brown, 1967
Simopelta paeminosa Snelling, 1971
Simopelta pentadentata 
Simopelta pergandei (Forel, 1909)
Simopelta quadridentata MacKay & MacKay, 2008
Simopelta transversa MacKay & MacKay, 2008
Simopelta vieirai MacKay & MacKay, 2008
Simopelta williamsi Wheeler, 1935

References

External links

Ponerinae
Ant genera
Hymenoptera of South America